The LaCroix-Mosher House is a historic house at 56 Everett Street in Southbridge, Massachusetts.  It is one of a few remaining Colonial Revival mansions from the early 20th century in Southbridge.  It was designed by architect George H. Clemence, and built c. 1904-07 for Joseph Lacroix, president of the Hyde Manufacturing Company.  In the late 1920s the house was acquired by Ira Mosher, vice president of the American Optical Company.

The house was listed on the National Register of Historic Places in 1989.

See also
National Register of Historic Places listings in Southbridge, Massachusetts
National Register of Historic Places listings in Worcester County, Massachusetts

References

Colonial Revival architecture in Massachusetts
Houses completed in 1904
Houses in Southbridge, Massachusetts
National Register of Historic Places in Southbridge, Massachusetts
Houses on the National Register of Historic Places in Worcester County, Massachusetts